General Abdul Satar Mirzakwal; Pashto «جنرال عبدالستار مېرزکوال» (born 1960) is an Afghan politician. He served as the Minister of Interior Affairs, Governor of Kunduz and Kunar Provinces of the Islamic Republic of Afghanistan. He was appointed as Interior Minister to the post on 19 June 2021. On 15 August 2021, he announced planning for the surrender of Kabul to the Islamic Emirate of Afghanistan.

References

External links
 Taliban reach Kabul. BBC World Service, Newshour, August 15, 2021

Afghan politicians
1960 births
Living people